UPCH may refer to:

 Cayetano Heredia University, Lima, Peru
 Undergraduate Preparatory Certificate for the Humanities, a foundation course at University College London
 Universidad Popular de la Chontalpa, Cárdenas, Mexico
 UPCH, catalog designation for Nayutawave Records, now part of EMI Records Japan